De Man Zonder Hart  is a 1937 Dutch drama film directed by Léo Joannon.

Cast
	... 	 Jean Sourdier
Dolly Mollinger	... 	Sylvette. his former secretary
Elias van Praag	... 	The man of the barrel organ
John Gobau	... 	Jeanton, the murdered companion of Soudier
Ank van der Moer	... 	Heilsoldate
Greta Eichenveld	... 	The daughter

External links 
 

1937 films
Dutch black-and-white films
1937 drama films
Films directed by Léo Joannon
Dutch multilingual films
Dutch drama films
1937 multilingual films
1930s Dutch-language films